Jenx is a French industrial metal band. They formed in 2003 in Bordeaux.

The group has played with many well-known acts such as Gojira, Paradise Lost, Oomph!, In Extremo, Punish Yourself, Loudblast, Dagoba...

Band members
 Xav Jenx − vocals, bass 
 Jessy Perey − guitar
 Niko Larronde − drums 
 Maxime Lainey- guitar 
 Lyynk − synthesizer, sound design

Discography
Studio albums
 Fuseless (2008)
 Enuma Elish (2012)

Other releases
 Unusual (2004)
 Mekamemories (2004)
 Compilation Printemps de Bourges (2005)
 Compilation Bordeaux Rock 2006 (2005)

External links 
 Official site
 The Call of Cthulhu Soundtrack by JENX

Musical groups established in 2003